NBC Out is a digital portal on the NBC News web site featuring LGBTQ-centric news, stories, and other forms of content. The site launched in June 2016. Brooke Sopelsa, formerly a producer at HuffPost Live, serves as NBC Out's managing editor.

In 2017, NBC Out launched an annual "#Pride30" list, that showcases a member of the LGBTQ community for each day of Pride Month. Honorees were chosen from nominations by the public, LGBTQ celebrities, and community leaders.

References

External links

2016 establishments in the United States
LGBT-related mass media in the United States
National Broadcasting Company
2016 in LGBT history